Aberdeen F.C. competed in the Scottish Premier Division, Scottish Cup, Scottish League Cup and UEFA Cup in season 1987–88.

Overview

Aberdeen finished fourth in the Premier Division for the second successive season. They reached the League Cup final, but lost 5–3 on penalty kicks after a 3–3 draw against Rangers in October. In the Scottish Cup, they lost in the semi-final after a second replay defeat to Dundee United. Aberdeen's UEFA Cup campaign ended in a second round defeat to Dutch club Feyenoord on the away goals rule, after defeating Irish club Bohemian F.C. in the first round.

New signings included Peter Nicholas from Luton Town, Gary Hackett, Tom Jones, Keith Edwards and Charlie Nicholas, who joined from Arsenal in December 1987.

Results

Scottish Premier Division

Final standings

Scottish League Cup

Scottish Cup

UEFA Cup

Squad

Appearances & Goals

|}

References

 

Aberdeen F.C. seasons
Aberdeen